Associazione Calcio Milan had another mediocre season in 2001–02, and the squad fell short of expectations. Milan finished 4th in the league, earning qualification to the Champions League, thanks to a strong conclusion to the season, holding off Chievo, Lazio and Bologna.

In Europe, Milan did well for much of the season and reached the semi-finals of the UEFA Cup, but were eliminated by a strong Borussia Dortmund side (who went on to win the Bundesliga that season), losing 4–0 at the Westfalenstadion in the first leg; Milan rallied and won 3–1 at the San Siro in the second leg, but this victory was not enough.

Squad
Squad at end of season

Transfers

Winter

Reserves

Competitions

Serie A

League table

Results by round

Results

Coppa Italia

Eightfinals

Quarterfinals

Semifinals

UEFA Cup

First round

Second round

Third round

Eightfinals

Quarterfinals

Semifinals

Squad Statistics

Appearances and goals

|-
! colspan=14 style=background:#dcdcdc; text-align:center| Players transferred out during the season

Goal scorers

References

Sources
  RSSF - Italy 2001/02

A.C. Milan seasons
Milan